Norbert Hajdú (born 1 October 1982) is a Hungarian footballer who currently plays as a midfielder for Zalaegerszegi TE.

Hajdú started to play football for Vác, making his first league debut at the age of 17. In 2001, he joined the youth team of Újpest FC and a year later the junior team, Újpest FC-Fót.
In 2003, he was signed by REAC, where he spent the 2003/04 season. After playing for Vác during the following season, he joined Tatabánya, where he became a widely known player. Hajdú joined Újpest FC in January, 2008 and later went on loan to Zalaegerszegi TE. Hajdú again joined Újpest FC in June, 2009 and later went on loan to Bp. Honvéd.

Club honours

Vác-Újbuda LTC
Hungarian National Championship II:
3rd place: 2004–05
Hungarian National Championship III:
3rd place: 2000–01

Újpest FC
Hungarian Cup:
Winner: 2001–02
Hungarian Super Cup:
Winner: 2001–02

Budapest Honvéd FC
Hungarian Super Cup:
Runners-up: 2009

External links
 HLSZ profile 

1982 births
Living people
Sportspeople from Eger
Hungarian footballers
Association football midfielders
Hungary youth international footballers
Vác FC players
Újpest FC players
FC Fót footballers
Rákospalotai EAC footballers
FC Tatabánya players
Zalaegerszegi TE players
Budapest Honvéd FC players
Budapest Honvéd FC II players
Nemzeti Bajnokság I players
21st-century Hungarian people